Sudurpashchim Province is one of the seven provinces established by the new constitution of Nepal which was adopted on 20 September 2015.  It borders the Tibet Autonomous Region of China to the north, Karnali Province and Lumbini Province to the east, and the India's Uttarakhand to the west and Uttar Pradesh to the south. The province covers an area of 19,539 km2 - about 13.22% of the country's total area. Initially known as Province No. 7, the newly elected Provincial Assembly adopted Sudurpashchim Province as the permanent name for the province in September 2018.
The province is coterminous with the former Far-Western Development Region, Nepal. The three major cities in terms of population and economy are Dhangadhi, Bhimdutta (Mahendranagar), and Tikapur.

History

Doti was an ancient kingdom in the far western region of Kumaon which was formed after the disintegration of the Katyuri  Kingdom of Kumaon around the 13th century. Doti was one of eight different princely states the Katyuri Kingdom was divided into eight for their eight prince's and became different independent kingdoms; Baijnath-Katyuri, Dwarahat, Doti, Baramandal, Askot, Sira, Sora, Sui (Kali Kumaon). Later on, the whole land between Ramganga on the west (Uttarakhand) and the Karnali on the east (which divides the far western region from other parts of Nepal), came under the Raikas after the origin of Raikas of Katyuris in Doti. "Brahma Dev Mandi" at Kanchanpur District of Mahakali Zone was established by Katyuri king Brahma Dev.

Before the announcement of new provinces in Nepal, the area of this province was known as Far-Western development region of Nepal. There were no changes made in this province when this province was made.

Raikas of Doti
Niranjan Malla Dev was the founder of  Khas Doti Kingdom around the 13th century after the fall of the Katyuri Kingdom. He was the son of Last Katyuris of united Katyuris kingdom.

Kings of Doti were called Raikas (also  Rainka Maharaj). Later on Raikas, after defeating the Khas Malla of Karnali Zone, were able to establish the strong Raikas Kingdom in Far Western Region and Kumaon which was Doti.

Mughal invasion 
During the period of Akbar's rule in the 16th century, the Mughals had attacked the Raikas of Doti. They invaded Ajemeru, the capital of the Raika Kingdom. Ajemeru is now in Dadeldhura District of the far western region of Nepal. Hussain Khan, army chief of Akbar residing in Lucknow had led the attack. According to `Abd al-Qadir Badayuni (c. 1540 - 1615), Indo-Persian historian during Mughal Empire, Mughal Army chief of Lucknow, Hussian Khan, lured by the wealth and treasures of the kingdom of the Raikas, wanted to plunder the region, this being the motive behind the assault, but they did not succeed.

Conflict with Gorkha 
The historic place of war between the Khas Doti Kingdom and Nepal (Khas Gorkha kingdom) during the period of Gorkha/Khas Expansion in 1790, according to the history of Nepal, is Nari-Dang, on the bank of the Seti River. The Dumrakot was the base of the Khas Doti Kingdom for fighting against the Own Khas Gorkhalis.

Khairgarh-Singhai State 
Raja Deep Shahi was expelled from Nepal in 1790 A.D and on arriving at Terai of Oudh (now Lakhimpur Kheri District of Uttar Pradesh of India) he established Khairgarh-Singhai State in Khairigarh under British India. Kanchanpur Praganna (present Kanchanpur and Kailali districts) was also the parts of his State or Zamindari. He succeeded in defeating the Banjaras rural of Khairigarh and establishing himself in that Pargana and in parts of Bhur. His state was merged with India In 1947 after Indian Independence.

Government and administration 

The Governor acts as the head of the province while the Chief Minister is the head of the provincial government. The Chief Judge of the Dipayal High Court is the head of the judiciary. The present Governor, Chief Minister and Chief Judge are Ganga Prasad Yadav (governor), Trilochan Bhatta (chief minister) and Yagya Prasad Basyal. The province has 53 provincial assembly constituencies and 16 House of Representative constituencies.

Sudurpashchim Province has a unicameral legislature, like all of the other provinces in Nepal. The term length of the provincial assembly is five years. The Provincial Assembly of Sudurpashchim Province is temporarily housed at the District Coordination Committee Hall in Dhangadhi.

Administrative subdivisions 
The province is divided into nine districts, which are listed below. A district is administrated by the head of the District Coordination Committee and the District Administration Officer. The districts are further divided into municipalities or rural municipalities. The municipalities include one sub-metropolitan city and 33 municipalities. There are 54 rural municipalities in the province.

 Achham District
 Baitadi District
 Bajhang District
 Bajura District
 Dadeldhura District
 Darchula District
 Doti District
 Kailali District
 Kanchanpur District

Demographics 

The province has a population of 2,552,517 which is 9.63% of the total population of Nepal. The population density is about 130 persons per square kilometer. The province has a population growth rate of 1.53%. The sex ratio is 912 males for 1000 females, with a total of 1,217,887 males and 1,334,630 females recorded in 2011. The urban population of the region is 1,504,279 (58.9%) and the rural population is 1,048,238 (41.1%).

Ethnic groups
The Khas/Chhetri are the largest Indigenous group, making up 44.09% of the population. The Tharu are the second largest, making up 17.15%. Other Khas groups including Hill Brahmin, Kami, Thakuri, Damai, Sarki, Lohar and Sanyasi make up 11.90%, 7.22%, 4.40%, 2.56%, 1.67%, 1.17% and 1.01% of the population. There are some Magars (2.18%) as well.

Languages
The vast majority of the population speaks language varieties closely related to Nepali, if not mutually intelligible. Eastern dialects such as Bajauri and Achhami are closer to the Khas Bhasha spoken in Karnali province. The main dialect in the province is Doteli, spoken in the central part of the province, which gradually gets closer to Kumaoni spoken on the Indian side of the border. Nearly the entire Terai population spoke Tharu until the 1950s, when many Doteli and Nepali speakers from the hills migrated to the Terai. The local Tharu variant has influence from Nepali and the Hindi dialects spoken in the plains to the south across the border. The largest Sino-Tibetan language is Magar, although there are still some speakers of Byangsi in the higher mountain regions near Tibet.

The Language Commission of Nepal has recommended Dotyali and Tharu as official language in the province. The commission has also recommended Baitadeli, Achhami, and Bajhangi to be additional official languages, for specific regions and purposes in the province.

Religion

See also
Provinces of Nepal
List of districts in Nepal

References

 
Provinces of Nepal
2015 establishments in Nepal
States and territories established in 2015